E. occidentalis may refer to:
 Emblemariopsis occidentalis, the flagfin blenny, blackfin blenny or redspine blenny, a fish species found around the Bahamas, Brazil and the Lesser Antilles
 Euthamia occidentalis, the western goldentop or western goldenrod, a flowering plant species common in western North America

See also 
 List of Latin and Greek words commonly used in systematic names